"Killing Me" is the twenty-sixth single by L'Arc-en-Ciel, released on January 13, 2005. It debuted at number 1 on the Oricon chart, and was certified Gold by RIAJ for shipment of 100,000 copies. The single aroused public notice because they collaborated with Sayaka Aoki on the B-side song, "Round and Round 2005" (the second appearance by their alter ego, P'unk-en-Ciel).

Track listing

References

2005 singles
L'Arc-en-Ciel songs
Oricon Weekly number-one singles
Songs written by Hyde (musician)
2005 songs
Ki/oon Music singles